Crenicichla lepidota is a species of cichlid native to South America. It is found in the Paraná River basin, it is widespread in the Paraguay River drainage in Brazil and Paraguay and the lower Paraná (below Guaira) in Paraguay and Argentina, and it is also along the coast of the Rio Grande do Sul, Brazil. Also found in the middle and lower Uruguay River in Brazil and Uruguay. Amazon River basin in the Guaporé River drainage in Brazil and Bolivia..

References

lepidota
Fish of Bolivia
Freshwater fish of Brazil
Fish of Paraguay
Fish of Uruguay
Freshwater fish of Peru
Fish of Argentina
Fish of the Amazon basin
Fish described in 1840
Taxa named by Johann Jakob Heckel